Alman is an English surname of multiple origin.
It can be a variant of Allman, Alleman, from the Anglo-Norman for "German", or of Swedish or German Ahl(e)mann, or of Jewish Almen "widower".

Notable people with the surname include:

Benjamin Alman (21st century), Canadian surgeon
Ewan David Alman (born 1984), British actor
Zuraidah Alman (21st century), Canadian news anchor

See also
Aleman (surname)

References

Ethnonymic surnames